Danny Anderson Cater (born February 25, 1940) is an American former professional baseball first baseman, third baseman, outfielder, and designated hitter. He signed with the Philadelphia Phillies at the age of 18, on June 8, 1958. Cater played in Major League Baseball (MLB) for the Phillies (1964), Chicago White Sox (1965–1966), Kansas City / Oakland Athletics (1966–1969), New York Yankees (1970–1971), Boston Red Sox (1972–1974), and St. Louis Cardinals (1975).

Cater played twelve seasons in the big leagues, mostly as a regular.

Cater finished second for the American League batting title in 1968 with a batting average of .290. That year is called "The Year of the Pitcher", and Carl Yastrzemski won the batting crown with a .301 batting average, the lowest mark ever to win a major league batting championship. Cater also led all American League first basemen with a .995 fielding percentage, that season. In 1972, he was part of a well known trade between the Yankees and the Red Sox where he was traded for Sparky Lyle.

Cater‘s career highlights included:
 a pair of 5-hit games: five singles vs. the Cleveland Indians (August 30, 1967); and a double and four singles vs. the Boston Red Sox (June 21, 1970)
 eighteen 4-hit games, with the most impressive being two singles, a double, and a home run good for 4 runs batted in and 4 runs scored vs. the California Angels (August 12, 1973)

Cater's career totals include 1,289 games played, 1,229 hits, 66 home runs, 519 runs batted in, and a .276 batting average.

After retiring from baseball, Cater worked at the headquarters office of the Texas Comptroller of Public Accounts in Austin, Texas. He now lives in Plano, Texas.

References

External links

Danny Cater at SABR (Baseball BioProject)
Danny Cater at Baseball Almanac

1940 births
Living people
Arkansas Travelers players
Bakersfield Bears players
Boston Red Sox players
Buffalo Bisons (minor league) players
Chicago White Sox players
Johnson City Phillies players
Kansas City Athletics players
Major League Baseball first basemen
Major League Baseball left fielders
Major League Baseball third basemen
New York Yankees players
Philadelphia Phillies players
Oakland Athletics players
St. Louis Cardinals players
Baseball players from Austin, Texas
Tulsa Oilers (baseball) players
Williamsport Grays players